Republic of the Rio Grande Museum is a historic house museum located in the downtown San Agustin de Laredo Historic District in Laredo, Texas, United States, next to the historic La Posada Hotel and San Agustín Cathedral. The Mexican vernacular structure was built in 1830 as a house with an addition in 1860. Among the people who have lived there was prominent rancher Bartolomé García, who was also one of Laredo's mayors, and who is a descendant of the town founder, Tomas Sanchez.

Once the Republic of the Rio Grande capitol building, it now showcases memorabilia from the short-lived Republic of the Rio Grande and displays pictures, books, and furniture from the 19th century Laredo area. There are three restored rooms re-creating an authentic 1830 home in Laredo; an office and sitting area, a bedroom, and a kitchen. Because of this Republic, Laredo had flown seven flags instead of the traditional Six flags over Texas.

The museum is operated by the Webb County Heritage Foundation, a non-profit 501 (c) (3) organization chartered in 1980 to promote historic preservation, education, and tourism.  The museum offers guided tours for school age children and adults year-round.

See also

National Register of Historic Places listings in Webb County, Texas
Recorded Texas Historic Landmarks in Webb County

References

External links

 Republic of the Rio Grande Museum - Webb County Heritage Foundation

Museums in Webb County, Texas
History museums in Texas
Buildings and structures in Laredo, Texas
1830 establishments in Mexico
Recorded Texas Historic Landmarks
Historic district contributing properties in Texas
Houses completed in 1830